The 285th Field Artillery Observation Battalion was a United States Army unit that saw action in the Battle of the Bulge in World War II. Their main mission was to identify the location of enemy artillery using the "sound and flash" technique (sound ranging and flash spotting).

Malmedy massacre

On 17 December 1944, members of  Battery B, 285th Field Artillery Observation Battalion were traveling from Aachen, Germany to the Ardennes in Belgium when 120 of them were captured by  Joachim Peiper's 1st SS Panzer Division at Baugnez,  lined up in a nearby field and mowed down with machine gun fire in what became known as the Malmedy massacre.

References

Field artillery battalions of the United States Army
Battalions of the United States Army in World War II